The Södermanland Runic Inscription 360  is a Viking Age runestone engraved in Old Norse with the Younger Futhark runic alphabet. It is located in Bjuddby, Blacksta, in Flen Municipality. The style of the runestone is a categorized as RAK.

Inscription
Transliteration of the runes into Latin characters

 : þurstin : reisti : stin : þisi : iffir : bruuʀ : sin þurbn ·: sun : ru-ts : farit : uas i : far-nki :
Old Norse transcription:

 

English translation:

 "Þorsteinn raised this stone in memory of his brother Þorbjôrn, Hrútr's(?) son. (He) had travelled ... "

References

Runestones in Södermanland